Culture House or House of Culture may refer to:

 Palace of Culture or House of Culture: clubhouse in the former Soviet Union and other Eastern Bloc countries
 Česká Lípa#Crystal Culture House 
 Haus der Kultur und Bildung (House of Culture and Education), Neubrandenburg: see Kulturfinger
 Skalica Culture House
 Štrpce#House of Culture
 Buen kulturhus, Mandal, Norway
 Buenos Aires House of Culture
 Casa de la Cultura Ecuatoriana (House of Ecuadorian Culture)
 Culture House, Reykjavík, see Safnahúsið
 Dunker Culture House, Helsingborg, Sweden
 Government House, Belize, site of the House of Culture Museum
 Kulttuuritalo (The House of Culture), Helsinki
 Kulturhuset (The House of Culture), Stockholm
 Kulturhuset (Randers) (The House of Culture), Randers, Denmark
 Laguna de Duero#Culture House
 Maison de la Culture de Grenoble
 Montalbán de Córdoba#Culture House
 The House of Culture (Hamar) (Kulturhuset), Hamar, Norway
 Vennesla Library and Culture House (Vennesla bibliotek og kulturhus), Vennesla, Norway

See also
 Cultural center
 Estonian House
 Haus der Kulturen der Welt (House of World Cultures), Berlin
 Institute of Culture
 Kulturhuset (disambiguation)
 Moscow theater hostage crisis, also known as House of Culture Incident